O. ovalis  may refer to:
 Oenopota ovalis, a sea snail species
 Oncoba ovalis, a plant species found in Cameroon and Nigeria

See also
 Ovalis (disambiguation)